Al-Zuq al-Tahtani was a Palestinian Arab village in the Safad Subdistrict. It was depopulated during the 1947–1948 Civil War in Mandatory Palestine on May 11, 1948, by the Palmach's First Battalion of Operation Yiftach. It was located 30 km northeast of Safad.

History
In 1875, Victor Guérin noted it south of Al-Zuq al-Fawqani, but with lesser important ruins.
In 1881, the PEF's Survey of Western Palestine described Zuk et Tahta: "Stone and mud village, with ruined Arab houses on north side, and a mill; contains about 100 Moslems; situated on the Huleh Plain ; arable land around, and a large stream near."

British Mandate era
In the 1931 census of Palestine,  conducted by the British Mandate authorities,  Al-Zuq al-Tahtani had a population of 626  Muslims,  in  a total of 137 houses.

In the  1945 statistics, the village had a total population of 1,050 Muslims, with a total of 11,634  dunams of land, according to an official land and population survey.   Of this, Arabs used 5,547 for plantations and irrigable land, 2,145   dunums  were for cereals; while a 39 dunams were classified as built-up, urban areas.

1948, aftermath
It became depopulated on May 11, 1948, in the aftermath of Operation Broom.

In 1950 the re-established Beyt Hillel was expanded to include Al-Zuq al-Tahtani land.

References

Bibliography

External links
Welcome To al-Zuq al-Tahtani
al-Zuq at-Tahtani, Zochrot
Survey of Western Palestine, Map 2:   IAA, Wikimedia commons
 al-Zuq al-Tahtani  from the Khalil Sakakini Cultural Center
 Al-Zuq al-Tahtani, Dr. Khalil Rizk.

Arab villages depopulated during the 1948 Arab–Israeli War
District of Safad